Mark G. Allen is a professor specializing in microfabrication, nanotechnology, and microelectromechanical systems at the University of Pennsylvania, where he is currently Alfred Fitler Moore Professor of Electrical and Systems Engineering Director of the Singh Center for Nanotechnology, and leader of the Microsensor and Microactuator Research Group. Prior to his joining the University of Pennsylvania in 2013, he was with the Georgia Institute of Technology, where he was Regents' Professor of Electrical and Computer Engineering and the J.M. Pettit Professor in Microelectronics. While at Georgia Tech, he also held multiple administrative positions, including Senior Vice Provost for Research and Innovation; Acting Director of the Georgia Electronic Design Center; and Inaugural Executive Director of Georgia Tech's Institute for Electronics and Nanotechnology. He was editor in chief of the Journal of Micromechanics and Microengineering (JMM), and currently serves on the editorial board of JMM as well as the journal Microsystems and Nanoengineering (Nature Publishing Group).

Education
Allen received a BA in chemistry, a BSE in chemical engineering and a BSE in electrical engineering from the University of Pennsylvania, and an MS in chemical engineering and a Ph.D. (1989) in microelectronic materials from the Massachusetts Institute of Technology.

Career
After completing his education in 1989, Allen became a member of the faculty of the School of Electrical and Computer Engineering of the Georgia Institute of Technology, ultimately holding the rank of Regents' Professor and the J.M. Pettit Professorship in Microelectronics. In 2013 he joined the University of Pennsylvania faculty as the Alfred Fitler Moore Professor of Electrical and Systems Engineering, as well as being named the founding director of the Singh Center for Nanotechnology at Penn.
Professor Allen’s current research interests are in the field of microfabrication and nanofabrication technology, with emphasis on new approaches to fabricate devices with characteristic lengths in the micro- to nanoscale from both silicon and non-silicon materials. He has published approximately 450 journal articles and conference proceedings, and holds nearly 60 patents (Google Scholar h‐index of 73, with 23,000+ citations). He has graduated approximately 50 Ph.D. students in various disciplines, including electrical and computer engineering; chemical and biomolecular engineering; mechanical engineering; materials science; polymer, textile, and fiber engineering; and biomedical engineering. Approximately one-third of his former Ph.D. students hold faculty positions around the world. Professor Allen was the co-chair of the 1996 IEEE/ASME Microelectromechanical Systems Conference, the 2012 Power MEMS Conference, and chaired the 2016 Solid State Sensors, Actuators, and Microsystems Conference. He was Editor-in-Chief of the Journal of Micromechanics and Microengineering (a publication of the Institute of Physics) from 2009-2013, and is currently a member of the editorial board of Microsystems and Nanoengineering (Nature Publishing Group). He is a Fellow of the IEEE, and recipient of the 2016 IEEE Daniel P. Noble award in emerging technologies for his work in MEMS. In 2017 he was elected to the National Academy of Inventors.
From 2007 to 2010, Professor Allen held the position of Senior Vice Provost for Research and Innovation at Georgia Tech. In that capacity had overall responsibility for management and growth of Georgia Tech’s annual research budget, oversaw Georgia Tech’s multiple interdisciplinary research centers, made strategic decisions on cost sharing and university investments in research, interfaced with the Federal Government through his supervision of Georgia Tech’s Office of Federal Relations, and guided the commercialization of Georgia Tech research results and intellectual property. He has testified before Congress on intellectual property issues facing universities, and has given multiple invited talks on issues facing research universities in the 21st century. He has previously served as a member of the MIT Corporation Visiting Committee for Sponsored Research.
From 2011-2013, Professor Allen served as the founding Executive Director of the Institute for Electronics and Nanotechnology (IEN). IEN is charged with supervision and coordination of Georgia Tech’s research activities across the continuum from nanotechnology to electronics, providing intellectual leadership for these activities, as well as management of Georgia Tech’s substantial nanotechnology infrastructure investments.
Professor Allen is co-founder of several spinoff companies, including CardioMEMS (www.cardiomems.com) and Axion Biosystems (www.axionbio.com). CardioMEMS was founded in 2001 has commercialized wireless implantable microsensors for treatment of aneurysms and congestive heart failure – ultimately becoming the first MEMS-based medical device transducers FDA-approved for permanent human implantation. CardioMEMS received the 2006 Company of the Year award from Small Times magazine and the 2006 Frost and Sullivan Patient Monitoring Product Innovation of the Year Award, and its wireless aneurysm pressure monitor was highlighted by the FDA in its 2005 ODE annual report as a cleared medical device likely to have a significant impact on patient care. CardioMEMS completed a 550‐patient clinical trial for its second product, a MEMS-based wireless implantable hemodynamic monitor for patients with congestive heart failure. After receiving FDA approval for its hemodynamic monitor, CardioMEMS was acquired by St. Jude Medical (now Abbott) in 2014. Axion Biosystems, founded in 2008, is commercializing microelectrode arrays for in-vitro electrogenic cell interfacing, for use in scientific study of neural and cardiac cells, as well as pharmaceutical screening. It is a revenue-generating company of approximately 40 employees, headquartered in Atlanta. In 2012, Axion won the Tibbetts Award, which honors outstanding small businesses, from the U.S. Small Business Administration. His latest venture, EnaChip (www.enachip.com), launched in 2017 and is focused on exploiting nanoengineered materials for the realization of ultracompact power supplies.

References

Living people
Georgia Tech faculty
University of Pennsylvania faculty
University of Pennsylvania School of Arts and Sciences alumni
MIT School of Engineering alumni
University of Pennsylvania School of Engineering and Applied Science alumni
1962 births